Groß-Enzersdorf is a town and municipality in the district of Gänserndorf in the Austrian state of Lower Austria, directly to the east of Vienna and north of the river Danube. Apart from the town itself, it also comprises seven subordinated municipalities.

History 
While the area of the municipality was probably inhabited in pre-Roman times, the first written mention of the settlement by the name of Encinesdorf dates to 1160. At its current location, an estate was founded in about 870. The terrain comprising this estate (the island Sahsonaganc, which roughly coincides with today's municipality) was donated to the Weihenstephan Abbey by Henry II in 1021, only to be transferred to the Diocese of Freising in 1028. While the general area was also under the influence of the Diocese of Passau, a document of 1202 formally associates the church in Groß-Enzersdorf to the Diocese of Freising. By 1298, all of Sahsonaganc belonged to the Diocese of Freising and the administrative center was located in what was then called Entzeinestorf.

In 1396, the settlement received formal town privileges, and the construction of the massive city wall started, which was finished in 1399 and today still stands almost intact. Despite these fortifications, the town was conquered several times and suffered serious damages in the subsequent centuries. In 1483, Matthias Corvinus sacked and damaged the town, and in 1529 the town was conquered and heavily damaged by troops of the Ottoman Empire during the Siege of Vienna. In the aftermath, many Croats rebuilt destroyed houses and eventually settled in the town. In 1554, a fire destroyed all but a few houses in the town. During the Thirty Years' War in the first half of the seventeenth century the town was occupied and again set on fire by troops of the Swedish Empire. This was followed by an outbreak of the Plague in 1679 and another occupation and partial destruction by the Ottoman Empire during the Second Siege of Vienna before the Battle of Vienna in 1683.

In 1693, Georg Rafael Donner, a baroque sculptor who was born in the neighboring village Eßling, was baptized in Groß-Enzersdorf, marking the beginning of a relatively calm period, interrupted only by another major fire in 1730. In 1803, the belongings of the Diocese of Freising were secularized and thus Groß-Enzersdorf was formally transferred to the House of Habsburg. The town became involved in acts of war again in 1809, during the Battle of Aspern-Essling and the Battle of Wagram, suffering major damages. The last major fire occurred in 1829, and in 1850 Groß-Enzersdorf became a district capital, which was moved to Floridsdorf in 1893. In the second half of the 19th century, a Jewish community was founded and eventually a synagogue was built. From 1886 on, the town was the terminus of a steam tramway connecting the town to the Viennese tram network, which was later electrified and ended service in 1970.

The Anschluss of Austria to Nazi Germany in 1938 also brought a major change on the local level for Groß-Enzersdorf: It was absorbed into the new Greater-Vienna and gave its name to the new 22nd district, Groß-Enzersdorf, which comprised many of the rural Marchfeld villages, but also some more urban zones on the left of the Danube that were already previously part of Vienna, such as Kaisermühlen. The synagogue was heavily damaged in the infamous Kristallnacht in November 1938, and most of the Jewish population was deported during this event. The synagogue building was used as a magazine during World War II and was demolished in 1963. During the World War, the town suffered aerial bombings during the Oil Campaign of World War II in 1944, because of its vicinity to an oil refinery in the Lobau. Groß-Enzersdorf was conquered by Soviet Armed Forces on April12, 1945. In Allied-occupied Austria the town was located in the Soviet zone and administratively remained in the 22nd district of Vienna until 1954, when it was re-established as a municipality within the state of Lower Austria.

The more recent history of Groß-Enzersdorf marks a shift from a service town characterized by its agricultural surroundings towards a suburban center, with many inhabitants commuting to Vienna.

Geography 

The city is 18 km east from the city center of Vienna. It lies on the main road 3. It is located near the Viennese quarter of Eßling and in the south the nature reserve Lobau which is a part of the national park Danube-Auen. 
The city consists of the following administrative communes:
Franzensdorf 
Groß-Enzersdorf 
Mühlleiten 
Oberhausen (including Neu-Oberhausen) 
Probstdorf 
Rutzendorf 
Schönau an der Donau 
Wittau

Politics 
The current mayor is Monika Obereigner-Sivec.
The district council houses 33 seats. Apportionment according to the district council elections form the 26th of January 2020: 15 seats SPÖ (Social Democratic Party of Austria) which chairman Monika Obereigner-Sivec, 11 seats ÖVP(Austrian People's Party) with chairman Peter Cepuder, 5 seats Die Grünen Groß-Enzersdorf (The Greens – The Green Alternative) which chairman Andreas Vanek, 2 seats FPÖ (Freedom Party of Austria) which  René Azinger and NEOS Groß-Enzersdorf 1 with Reinhard Wachmann.

Culture and POIs 
Austrias only remaining Drive-in theater is situated in Groß-Enzersdorf, directly on the border to Vienna. It was opened 1967 and extended in 1990 to a "center" including three screens. On Sundays a flea market is held in the town. 
In the year 1889 a Jewish cemetery was built in Groß-Enzersdorf, but unfortunately it has been recently vandalized.

Buildings 
 Groß-Enzersdorf is very famous for its defensive wall. It was built from 1396 to 1399 and is still nearly completely intact.
 Parish church, which is built in the romanesque, gothic and baroque styles.
 The city-hall is well preserved, and parts of the former civil hospital.

Sports 
Serious sports is done in table-tennis. The team of the UKJ Groß-Enzersdorf plays in the 2nd leagues (2. Bundesliga) and also important for its role in 
junior programs. There is also a football team (SC Groß-Enzersdorf).

References

 Official web page of Groß-Enzersdorf In German.
 Web page of the roman catholic parish Groß-Enzersdorf In German.

Cities and towns in Gänserndorf District
Croatian communities in Austria
Holocaust locations in Austria